Elizabeth Ann Lynn (7 November 1933 – 30 August 2020) was a British actress, especially prominent during the British New Wave of the 1960s, appearing in many films that represented what is known as kitchen sink realism. 

Lynn's career spanned 40 years and included roles in many British TV series, including The Count of Monte Cristo (1956), The Vise (1959–1960), Danger Man (1965), The Saint, Gideon's Way (1965), Public Eye (1966), The Champions (episode: The Body Snatchers) (1969), Family at War (1972), Special Branch (1973), Just Good Friends, Minder and Only Fools And Horses.

Film
Lynn's films included Flame in the Streets (1961); Strongroom (1961); A Shot in the Dark (1964); Four in the Morning (1965); I'll Never Forget What's'isname (1967); Baby Love (1968); and Screamtime (1983), alongside Dora Bryan and Robin Bailey.

Personal life
Lynn was a grand niece of the comedy actor Ralph Lynn. She married Anthony Newley in August 1956. They divorced on 26 April 1963. Their only child, a son, was born with spina bifida and died while an infant.

Partial filmography

 Johnny, You're Wanted (1956) – Chorine (uncredited)
 Keep It Clean (1956) – Chorus Girl
 Moment of Indiscretion (1958) – Pauline
 Naked Fury (1959) – Stella
 Piccadilly Third Stop (1960) – Mouse
 The Wind of Change (1961) – Jose Marley
 Strip Tease Murder (1961) – Rita
 Flame in the Streets (1961) – Judy Gomez
 The Secret Thread  (1962) (TVM) - Ida
 H.M.S. Defiant (1962) – Young wife whose husband is pressed (uncredited)
 Strongroom (1962) – Rose Taylor
 Doctor in Distress (1963) – Mrs. Whittaker
 Espionage (TV series)  ('Final Decision', episode) (1964) - Joanna
 A Shot in the Dark (1964) – Dudu
 The System (1964) – Ella
 The Black Torment (1964) – Diane
 The Party's Over (1965) – Libby
 Four in the Morning (1965) – Girl
 The Uncle (1965) – Sally Morton
 I'll Never Forget What's'isname (1967) – Carla
 Separation (1968) – Woman
 Baby Love (1969) – Amy
 The Love Machine (1971) – Model (uncredited)
 The Spy's Wife (1972) – (uncredited)
 The Other Side of the Underneath (1972)
 Hitler: The Last Ten Days (1973) – Fraulein Junge
 Who Pays the Ferryman? (1977) - Lorna Matthews
 Screamtime (1983) – Lena

References

External links

1933 births
2020 deaths
English film actresses
English television actresses